Lastic may refer to the following places in France:

 Lastic, Cantal, a commune in the Cantal department
 Lastic, Puy-de-Dôme, a commune in the Puy-de-Dôme department